Rue d'Assas is a street in the 6th arrondissement of Paris, named after Nicolas-Louis d'Assas.

Features
 Musée Edouard Branly (at #21)
 Musée "Bible et Terre Sainte" (at #21)
 Main campus of Panthéon-Assas University (at #92)
 Zadkine Museum (at #100)
 Jardin du Luxembourg: rue d'Assas borders the Jardin between rue Guynemer and rue Auguste-Comte
 Hélène Darroze's cafe

Notable people
Jeanne Baptiste d'Albert de Luynes lived at #8.
Frédéric Auguste Bartholdi, the sculptor of the Statue of Liberty, had his last residence and studio at #82.
Joe Dassin lived at #28, from 1968 to 1974.
Charles Aznavour was born at Tarnier Clinic at #89.

References

External links

Map of Paris (browser plugin required)
For an aerial photograph tick Voie, adresse and type Abbaye

Assas, Rue d'